Joseph Tremain (born 11 October 1991 in Romford, Havering) is an English actor. He has appeared on radio and in theatre, TV and films. He has also appeared in a number of commercials for a variety of products. Tremain made his West End stage début in a production of The Full Monty at the age of 10. He is best known for starring in the first series (13 episodes) of the children's television series Morris 2274 in 2003 for Five television. He has also appeared in an episode of Half Moon Investigations for the BBC. He attended the Sylvia Young Theatre School in London.

Filmography

External links
 

Living people
1991 births
People from Romford
English male film actors
English male television actors